OHT may refer to:

 OHT - PAF Base Kohat, Pakistan
 OHT - Office for a Human Theatre, Italy